The Östergötland class were a class of destroyers built for the Swedish Navy in the late 1950s. They were smaller and less capable than the preceding  and were decommissioned in 1982. The class were the last destroyers built by Sweden in the 20th century. They were sometimes referred to as Light destroyers.

Ships

Notes

References

 Gardiner, Robert and Stephen Chumbley. Conway's All The World's Fighting Ships 1947–1995. Annapolis, Maryland, USA, 1995. .

 
Destroyer classes
Ships built in Gothenburg